Laetesia trispathulata is a species of sheet weaver spider found in New Zealand. It was described by Urquhart in 1886.

References

Linyphiidae
Spiders of New Zealand
Spiders described in 1886